Roman Erich Petsche (born 3 February 1907 in Gottschee, Slovenia, died 1993 in Ried im Innkreis, Upper Austria) was an Austrian teacher, school attendant and painter. He was awarded Righteous among the Nations, by the memorial site Yad Vashem.

He was raised in Gottschee, a German linguistic enclave in Slovenia, as the son of a German-speaking teacher and a Galizian aristocracy originated mother, whom he later described as a “nationality aware Pole”. In 1919 the family moved to Salzburg, where, after the flight from Gottschee, which was now part of the Kingdom of Serbs, Croats and Slovenes, his father found work in teacher education in Salzburg. After finishing school in 1925 Petsche studied in Vienna. From 1929 on he worked as a teacher, at first in Salzburg, from 1931 to 1933 in Ried im Innkreis and from 1933 on in St. Pölten.

In 1944 Petsche was an officer of the Wehrmacht in the city of Novi Sad where he was accommodated by the Jewish family Csarneyi. The Jewish attorney Dr. Tibor, his wife Vera and their five-year-old twin daughters also lived in the same house.

On 25 March 1944, 4,000 Jews were supposed to be deported to Auschwitz concentration camp. Petsche decided to save the two underage daughters of Dr. Tibor and traveled with the children and a housemaid to Budapest to an aunt of the children. Petsche passed the housemaid as his wife and the children as his own. That very same night Petsche traveled back to Novi Sad to help Dr. Tibor and his family members to get train tickets, so they could leave Novi Sad. The ill grandmother of the Tibors stayed back in Novi Sad. Petsche took her to a hospital and took care for her until she died. Nevertheless, Vera Tibor, her daughters and their aunt were arrested and deported to Auschwitz. The aunt and the children survived and settled down in Israel after the war.

After World War II, Petsche worked in Linz as a teaching instructor from 1945 to 1950, then from 1950 on for the school supervisory board, and among other things as inspector for art education for several states. He retired in 1972 and moved back to Ried im Innkreis. Besides his career he kept active as a painter, although he never offered his paintings on the art market. He preferred figurative motives, which, with age, he almost exclusively created in a headstrong collage technique made out of colourful chalk drawings and light prints, that he called Lumigraphie. Museums in Ried and Graz, amongst others, still show his art.

By 1983 Petsche, who was by then court counsellor (Hofrat), was awarded Righteous among the Nations by the Israeli memorial site Yad Vashem for the rescue of the Tibor family. As reasons for his actions Petsche stated “the self-evident human command, to help others in need”. He was also aware of his mother’s family destiny, who lost several family members in a concentration camp.

In 2002 at the 11th Braunauer Zeitgeschichte-Tage his paintings were shown in combination with the theme civil courage and resistance to dictatorships in Kultur im Gugg.

References

External links
 Roman Erich Petsche – his activity to save Jews' lives during the Holocaust, at Yad Vashem website

20th-century Austrian painters
Austrian male painters
Austrian Righteous Among the Nations
1907 births
1993 deaths
People from Kočevje
20th-century Austrian male artists